"Sólo Quédate En Silencio" (English: "Just Stay in Silence'") is the second single released from RBD's debut album Rebelde (2004). The second single was first meant to be "Un Poco De Tu Amor", but due to the heavy rotation of "Sólo Quédate En Silencio", it was chosen as the second single.

Chart performance
The song became RBD's first successful single internationally.  The song peaked at number two on Billboard's Hot Latin Tracks, as well as number twenty-three (#23) on the U.S. Hot Ringtones chart and number one on the Hot Latin Pop Airplay chart.

The Brazilian version of the song peaked at number 2 on Billboard's Hot Latin Tracks.

It received good reviews by critics and gave RBD mainstream radio airplay in the U.S. It was also used to promote the first season of their soap opera Rebelde.

An English version of the song was also recorded in 2006. The song is called "Keep It Down Low" and appears on RBD's first English studio album, Rebels.

The song has a version in Portuguese as well, called "Fique Em Silêncio" (Stay In Silence) and was released as a single in Brazil. This makes the song the only one from RBD, along with "Sálvame", "Tenerte Y Quererte", "Nuestro Amor" and "Dame" to have three versions: in Spanish, English and Portuguese.

In November 2008, "Sólo Quédate En Silencio" is promoted in the Latin-American countries of Argentina and Uruguay, as well as Equatorial Guinea in Africa.

Music video
The video was the second RBD video directed by Pedro Damián. Similar to "Rebelde," it was shot in Desierto de los Leones in Mexico. While the band was shooting the music video for "Rebelde," they  shot some additional takes of "Sólo Quédate en Silencio."

The video features the band performing on a famous avenue in Mexico City, extra footage from their radio station concerts, and different scenes of them in various parts of Mexico performing.

Versions

Track listings
Brazilian promotional single (Fique Em Silêncio / Salva-me)
 Fique Em Silêncio - 03:37
 Salva-me - 03:43

American 2004 single
 Sólo Quédate En Silencio - 03:37
 Sólo Quédate En Silencio (Edited Remix) - 03:43

International single
 Sólo Quédate En Silencio
 Fique Em Silêncio
 Keep It Down Low
(this single was released along with Rebels (album) in some countries and internet)
All tracks are 3:37.

Release history

Awards

Charts

1: as "Fique em Silêncio", a Brazilian version of the song.

References 

2004 singles
2005 singles
RBD songs
Spanish-language songs
Pop ballads
2004 songs
EMI Records singles
Song recordings produced by Armando Ávila